The term Silicon battery may refer to the following battery technologies:
Lithium–silicon battery, a battery containing a silicon anode
Solid state silicon battery, a battery containing a silicon anode and a solid-state electrolyte
A silicon-containing Nanowire battery
Silicon–air battery